The Pigg's Peak mine is a large iron mine located in central Eswatini in the Hhohho District. Pigg's Peak represents one of the largest iron ore reserves in Eswatini and in the world having estimated reserves of 700 million tonnes of ore grading 35% iron metal.

References 

Iron mines in Eswatini
Hhohho Region